Miloš Milisavljević (born 26 October 1992) is a Serbian professional footballer who plays as a midfielder for Greek Super League 2 club Makedonikos.

References

External links
 
 Miloš Milisavljević stats at utakmica.rs 
 

1992 births
Living people
Sportspeople from Valjevo
Association football midfielders
Serbian footballers
Serbian expatriate footballers
FK Budućnost Valjevo players
FK Mačva Šabac players
FK Kolubara players
FK Rad players
FK Javor Ivanjica players
FK Mladost Doboj Kakanj players
FK Železničar Lajkovac players
FK Inđija players
FK TSC Bačka Topola players
FK Metalac Gornji Milanovac players
Makedonikos F.C. players
Serbian SuperLiga players
Serbian First League players
Premier League of Bosnia and Herzegovina players
Super League Greece 2 players
Serbian expatriate sportspeople in Bosnia and Herzegovina
Expatriate footballers in Bosnia and Herzegovina
Serbian expatriate sportspeople in Greece
Expatriate footballers in Greece